Basketball at the 2007 Pan American Games took place at the indoor arena in the Autódromo de Jacarépagua in Rio de Janeiro, Brazil, an arena which was built specially for the Pan Am Games. Brazil was the reigning Pan American champion in the men's competition, while Cuba defended its title in the women's competition.

Each competition had eight teams divided in two groups. In each group, each team played against all others once and the two best advanced to the semifinals. The two latter in each group played in 5th to 8th classification matches. The women's competition started on July 20 with the final held on July 24. The men's competition began on July 25, with the finals on July 29.

Men's

Squads

Group A

Group B

Semifinals

Classification 5–8

Finals

Classification 7–8

Classification 5–6

Bronze-medal match

Gold-medal match

Final classification

Awards

Women's

Squads

Group A

Group B

Semifinals

Classification 5–8

Finals

Classification 7–8

Classification 5–6

Bronze-medal match

Gold-medal match

Final classification

Awards

References
 Official Results

 
basketball
2007
2007–08 in South American basketball
2007–08 in North American basketball
2007–08 in Brazilian basketball
International basketball competitions hosted by Brazil